Pireh Sorkh-e Bala (also Romanized as Pīreh Sorkh-e Bālā; also known as Pīr Sorkh and Pīr Sorkh-e Bālā) is a village in Bakesh-e Do Rural District, in the Central District of Mamasani County, Fars Province, Iran. At the 2006 census, its population was 224, in 50 families.

References 

Populated places in Mamasani County